"(Theme from) Valley of the Dolls" is a 1967 song by André and Dory Previn, composed for the film version of the Jacqueline Susann novel Valley of the Dolls, and recorded by Dionne Warwick.

Actress Barbara Parkins, who starred in the motion picture, suggested that Warwick be considered to sing the film's theme song. The song was to be given to Judy Garland, who had been fired from the film. A recording by Warwick appeared on the B-side of her original version of Burt Bacharach and Hal David's "I Say a Little Prayer," a big hit which peaked at no. 4 on Billboard's Hot 100 in the chart dated 9 December 1967 and which was RIAA-certified gold in February 1968. In January 1968, when the film Valley of the Dolls dominated the US box office, B-side "Valley of the Dolls" entered the Hot 100 in its own right. It reached no. 2, where in February and March it remained for four weeks, stuck behind two blockbuster singles: Paul Mauriat's "Love Is Blue" and Otis Redding's "(Sittin' On) The Dock of the Bay". It also reached no. 2 on the Easy Listening charts, no. 2 on the Cash Box Top 100 and number one on the Record World chart. "Valley of the Dolls" peaked at number one on many radio stations across America, among them WLS in Chicago.

Warwick re-recorded a Pat Williams-arranged and Burt Bacharach-produced version of the theme at A&R Studios in New York because contractual restrictions from her home label, Scepter Records, would not allow her version from the film to be included in the 20th Century-Fox soundtrack album. In April 1968, the RIAA-certified Gold Scepter LP that contained the hit version of the song, Dionne Warwick in Valley of the Dolls, peaked at no. 6 on the  Billboard album chart, and would remain on the chart for more than a year.

In the UK "(Theme from) Valley of the Dolls" was released in February 1968, with "Zip-a-Dee-Doo-Dah" as the B-side. The single peaked at no. 28 – the singer's first UK chart hit since 1965.

Charts

Weekly charts

Certifications

Cover versions
 Gladys Knight & the Pips – album Silk N' Soul (1968)
 Andy Williams – album Honey (1968)
 Jack Jones – album Where is Love? (1968, RCA)
 John Davidson - album Goin’ Places (1968)
 Dorothy Ashby – album Afro-Harping (1968)
 Gábor Szabó – album Bacchanal (1968, Skye Records)
 The Chopsticks – album Some Day (1970)
 Eruption – album Leave a Light (1979)
 k.d. lang – album Drag (1997)
 Marcia Hines – album Time of Our Lives (1999)
 Ana Gasteyer – album I'm Hip'' (2014)

References

https://chasblaum.net/2019/01/26/dionne-warwick-theme-from-valley-of-the-dolls-1968/

1968 singles
Songs with music by André Previn
Songs with lyrics by Dory Previn
Songs written for films
Dionne Warwick songs
K.d. lang songs
Andy Williams songs
Film theme songs
1967 songs
Scepter Records singles